Securiflustra is a genus of bryozoans belonging to the family Flustridae.

The species of this genus are found in Europe, North America, southernmost South America.

Species:

Securiflustra bifoliata 
Securiflustra securifrons

References

Bryozoan genera